Prescott-Brown was a Canadian country music trio composed of Tracey Brown, her brother Barry and her husband Randall Prescott. All three were members of Canadian country group, Family Brown, which parted ways in 1990. Signed to Columbia Records, the trio released two albums for the label in 1992 and 1994. The trio made appearances on shows such as The Tommy Hunter Show, The Dini Petty Show, Rita and Friends, Open Mike with Mike Bullard and Adrienne Clarkson Presents.

Biography
Tracey Brown, Barry Brown and Randall Prescott originally came together in 1991 as Tracey Prescott & Lonesome Daddy. The trio's eponymous debut album was released by Sony Music Canada in 1992. Five singles were released from the project, including the Top 10 song "When You're Not Loving Me." The following year, Tracey Prescott & Lonesome Daddy won a Juno Award for Best Country Group or Duo.

They changed their name to Prescott-Brown for the release of their second studio album, 1994's Already Restless. The album's first single, "There You Go," brought them back into the Top 10 of the Canadian country singles chart. Prescott-Brown was nominated for Best Country Group or Duo at the 1995 Juno Awards.

Since disbanding in 1996, Tracey launched a successful solo career.

Tracey Brown and Randall Prescott have two grown children Kelly Prescott and Kaylen Prescott. Following in their parents footsteps they are currently working on producing a full-length album under the band name "Prescott". They have performed at various venues local to their hometown rural of Ottawa. They have also performed at Ottawa's Bluesfest. Their style is reminiscent of the country influences of their parents, but have incorporated elements rock, blues and various instruments into their music.

Discography

Albums

Singles

Music videos

References

Canadian country music groups
Columbia Records artists
Juno Award winners
Musical groups established in 1991
Musical groups disestablished in 1996
1991 establishments in Ontario